Pernell Cooper (June 28, 1963 – January 27, 2016) was an American Paralympic powerlifter. He competed at two Paralympic Games and was a Paralympic champion at the 2000 Summer Paralympics and a bronze medalist at the 1996 Summer Paralympics.

References

1963 births
2016 deaths
Sportspeople from Atlanta
Paralympic powerlifters of the United States
Medalists at the 1996 Summer Paralympics
Medalists at the 2000 Summer Paralympics
Powerlifters at the 1996 Summer Paralympics
Powerlifters at the 2000 Summer Paralympics
Paralympic medalists in powerlifting
Paralympic gold medalists for the United States
Paralympic bronze medalists for the United States